The 1971 Nebraska Cornhuskers football team represented the University of Nebraska in the Big Eight Conference during the 1971 NCAA University Division football season. The Cornhuskers were led by tenth-year head coach Bob Devaney and played their home games at Memorial Stadium in Lincoln.

The Huskers went undefeated at 13–0, repeating as national champions. They outscored their thirteen opponents 507 to 104, held ten of them to single-digit points or fewer (including three shutouts), and famously defeated second-ranked Oklahoma on the road in a game that has been referred to as the "Game of the Century". In the years since, the 1971 Nebraska team has been cited by some sports pundits as the greatest in college football history.

Schedule
The 1971 Cornhuskers were one of the most dominant teams in college football history, winning twelve of their thirteen games by 24 points (or more) and defeating the next three teams in the final AP poll. The sole close game of the season was the Game of the Century at #2 Oklahoma on Thanksgiving. Nebraska decisively beat #3 Colorado (then #9) 31–7 in Lincoln and #4 Alabama (then #2) 38–6 in the 1972 Orange Bowl in Miami.

Roster

Coaching staff

Game summaries

Oregon

The Nebraska reserves were on the field in the 4th quarter, working under a comfortable 34-0 lead, when a fumbled punt allowed Oregon to put in a late score to avoid the shutout with 3 minutes to play.

Two days later, Nebraska vaulted Notre Dame for the No. 1 spot in the polls and never relinquished it.

Minnesota

Minnesota managed a 2nd-quarter touchdown, but the game was never really in doubt as Nebraska extended their unbeaten streak to 21 games.

Texas A&M

Two huge plays left Nebraska's signature on the Texas A&M win, as Johnny Rodgers tore off a 98-yard kickoff return for a touchdown, and Bill Kosch returned an interception 95 yards for a score of his own.  The Aggies also managed a big score for their only points, an equally-impressive 94-yard kickoff return touchdown.

Utah State

Utah State was behind 0-35 when they managed to avoid the shutout with a 3rd-quarter touchdown, but the PAT was blocked.  The Cornhuskers ran the margin of victory back up again with a final fourth-quarter touchdown.

Missouri

Nebraska was held scoreless for over 20 minutes, but Missouri eventually succumbed to the pressure as Nebraska then ran up 36 points and shut out the Tigers in Columbia.

Kansas

Nebraska smashed Kansas at Homecoming for another shutout, holding the Jayhawks to 56 yards of total offense, barely more than one tenth of the Cornhuskers' 538 yards.

Oklahoma State

All of Oklahoma State's entire scoring was picked up in the last 2 minutes against Nebraska reserves, making the game appear closer than it was, if 41-13 can be called close.

Colorado

Nebraska rolled right out to a 24-0 lead by halftime and was cruising against #9 Colorado without much effort.  The Buffaloes did manage a 3rd-quarter touchdown on a broken play, but Nebraska matched it and easily held on for the win.

Iowa State

The Cornhuskers held Iowa State to just 105 yards of offense and had no trouble holding the Sun Bowl-bound Cyclones off the scoreboard for another shutout.

Kansas State

Nebraska QB Jerry Tagge became the first Cornhusker to exceed 5000 career yards at Kansas State as Nebraska scored touchdowns on each of its first four possessions.  Johnny Rodgers also entered the record book with his 10-season touchdown receptions, 45 receptions on the season, and 84 receptions for his career.  No other team managed to score so many points on Nebraska this season as did the Wildcats, but another convincing win was behind them as Nebraska prepared for a showdown with #2 Oklahoma to decide the Big 8 title and potentially the national championship.

Oklahoma

Oklahoma and Nebraska battled back and forth in the Game of the Century in front of a sold-out crowd in Norman and over 55 million viewers on ABC-TV on Thanksgiving Day.  Nebraska struck first with a 72-yard Johnny Rodgers punt return, but Oklahoma pulled ahead by 3 by halftime.  The Cornhuskers came back strong in the third quarter with two more touchdowns, but the Sooners responded with two of their own to retake the lead with only 7:10 remaining.  Down by 3 points, the Huskers went on a final drive and with only 1:38 remaining, Jeff Kinney scored his fourth touchdown of the day for the lead and the win.

Hawaii

Almost 1/3 of the fans in the relatively sparse crowd were dressed in red and rooting for the Cornhuskers, as Nebraska handily won this game almost as an afterthought to the vacation in Honolulu.  It was 24-3 at the half, and Hawaii never saw the scoreboard again.

The victory wrapped up the UPI coaches poll national championship for the Cornhuskers. The UPI did not conduct a post-bowl poll until 1974.

Alabama

In the 1972 Orange Bowl, the Huskers battled a #2 team for the second time this season, but Alabama hardly posed the challenge that the Oklahoma Sooners had been, as Nebraska sent the Crimson Tide to the locker room at the half trailing by an embarrassing 28-0.  Alabama managed a feeble third-quarter touchdown but failed in the following 2-point conversion and never scored again, while Nebraska responded with 10 more points of their own to close the game and ended the season as national champions for the second consecutive year and exact revenge for losses to Alabama in the 1966 Orange Bowl and 1967 Sugar Bowl.

Rankings

Awards

Jerry Tagge finished seventh in the Heisman Trophy balloting in 1971,teammate Johnny Rodgers would win in 1972.

1971 team players in the NFL

The 1971 Nebraska Cornhuskers seniors selected in the 1972 NFL Draft:

The 1971 Nebraska Cornhuskers juniors selected in the following year's 1973 NFL Draft:

The 1971 Nebraska Cornhuskers sophomores selected in the 1974 NFL Draft:

NFL and pro players
The following is a list of 1971 Nebraska players who joined a professional team as draftees or free agents.

References

Nebraska
Nebraska Cornhuskers football seasons
College football national champions
Big Eight Conference football champion seasons
Orange Bowl champion seasons
College football undefeated seasons
Nebraska Cornhuskers football